Melvin T. Lunsford (born June 13, 1950) is a former American football player from 1973 through 1980 for the New England Patriots. He was drafted by the Oakland Raiders in the 1972 NFL Draft.

During a November game against the Bills Lunsford and several other Patriots defenders stuffed superstar running back O. J. Simpson for no gain and as Simpson tried to continue driving forward Lunsford bodyslammed him to the ground. Simpson got up and punched Lunsford which prompted Lunsford to swing back. Bills offensive lineman Reggie McKenzie then jumped on Lunsford's back but Lunsford bent down and flung McKenzie over his head and went back to swinging at Simpson before a melee of the two teams stopped the fight and ended up in a pile on the field. Lunsford and Simpson were both ejected from the game as the Patriots solid defense persisted with New England going on to win 20-10 on their way to finishing the 1976 season 11-3. The Bills finished 2-12.

References

1950 births
Living people
American football defensive linemen
Central State Marauders football players
New England Patriots players
Players of American football from Cincinnati